The Pottery Maker, also known as Story of a Potter, is a 1926 American documentary short film directed by Robert J. Flaherty.

Production
The Pottery Maker is one of two short films produced by private sponsors and directed by filmmaker Robert J. Flaherty after the completion of his second feature Moana in 1925.

Produced by the New York Metropolitan Museum of Arts, and sponsored by actress and Flaherty admirer Maude Adams, the short film was shot in the basement of the museum, using new Mazda incandescent lamps.

References

External links 
Complete film

1926 films
American short documentary films
American black-and-white films
Pottery
Films directed by Robert Flaherty
1926 documentary films
1926 short films
American silent feature films
Black-and-white documentary films
1920s short documentary films
1920s American films